In phonetics, length or quantity is a feature of sounds that have distinctively extended duration compared with other sounds. There are long vowels as well as long consonants (the latter are often called geminates).

Many languages do not have distinctive length. Among the languages that have distinctive length, there are only a few that have both distinctive vowel length and distinctive consonant length. It is more common that there is only one or that they depend on each other.

The languages that distinguish between different lengths have usually long and short sounds. The Mixe languages are widely considered to have three distinctive levels of vowel length, as do Estonian, some Low German/Low Saxon varieties in the vicinity of Hamburg and some Moselle Franconian and Ripuarian Franconian varieties.

Strictly speaking, a pair of a long sound and a short sound should be identical except for their length. Also, tonal contour may reinforce the length, as in Estonian, where the over-long length is concomitant with a tonal variation resembling tonal stress marking.

In transcription in the International Phonetic Alphabet, long vowels or consonants are notated with the length sign (ː Unicode U+02D0 MODIFIER LETTER TRIANGULAR COLON) after the letter. Diacritics may occur over either the base letter, the length sign, or both. For example, in some non-rhotic varieties of English the /t/ of the word party may be nearly elided, with just some breathy-voice remaining, in which case it may be transcribed . A morpheme may be reduced to length plus nasalization, in which case a word might be transcribed .

In this non-linear phonology, the feature of length is often not a feature of a specific sound segment, but rather of the whole syllable.

See also
 Chroneme
 Extra-short
 Colon (letter)

References 

Phonology